Alphonse Michel Rebière (Tulle, 1842 – Paris, 1900) was a nineteenth-century advocate for women's scientific abilities. He wrote the book Les Femmes dans la science, published in 1894. Rebière's piece followed the encyclopedia format, listing the woman alphabetically, giving their names, dates of birth, the social conditions under which they had lived, their contributions and publications. He included "professional and amateur" scientists and those who aided in contributions in "the progress of science." Included in Rebière's book was a section of appended works filled with opinions of famous people on the question "whether or not woman is capable of scientific pursuits."  His work was revolutionary in that other works with similar information were never published, and he was one of the first to include women in the field of science.

Les Femmes dans la science
Translated: The Achievements of the German Woman

Rebière's work Les Femmes dans la science was inspired by the women's movement and renewed interest in women's scientific abilities.

Mathématiques et mathématiciens: Pensées et curiosities 
According to R. C. Archibald:

Publications
His publications include:

 Mathématiques et mathématiciens: pensées et curiosités, Libraire Nony & Cie, Paris, 1e édition, 1889; 2e éd., 1893; 4e éd., 1911
 Les Femmes dans la science, Libraire Nony & Co, Paris, 1894
 Jean-François Melon l'économiste, Crauffon, 1896
 Les savants modernes: leur vie et leur travaux, d'après les documents académiques, Libraire Nony & Co, Paris, 1899

References

1842 births
1900 deaths
Women and science
French science writers
People from Tulle